German International School Sydney is a German international school in Terrey Hills, Sydney, New South Wales.

It serves from Preschool until IBDP Senior Secondary (Sekundarstufe II).

Curriculum
The primary school, years 1-6, uses a German immersion programme. The secondary school has two divisions: a German stream and an English stream; 85% of the secondary students are in the German stream. Students in the English stream, making up the remainder of the students, take German classes.

Certain subjects are taught to all students in German, such as Year 8 Biology, while others are taught to all students in English, such as Year 8 Chemistry and Geography. Students from both streams take the same art and music classes.

Operations
The school does not require its students to wear school uniforms. The tuition for the youngest students, as of 2014, is $10,000 Australian dollars. The tuition for students years 11 and 12, as of the same year, varies depending on the subjects chosen for the International Baccalaureate program. The highest possible annual tuition for a year 11 or 12 student is $20,000.

Student body
As of 2014 the school has 230 students, with half of them being of a German background.

See also

 German Australian
 Deutsche Schule Melbourne

References

External links
 German International School Sydney
  German International School Sydney

Sydney
German-Australian culture
International schools in Sydney
Private schools Northern Beaches Sydney
Educational institutions established in 1989
1989 establishments in Australia